Louis Marc Adolphe Belot was a French playwright and novelist. He was born on 6 November 1829 in Pointe-à-Pitre, and died on 18 December 1890 in Paris.

Biography 
Adolphe Belot was the son of an attorney employed by the Pointe-à-Pitre court. Born in Le Havre, France, Belot was raised in the metropolis at the Sainte-Barbe college before obtaining his license at the Faculty of Law in Paris. In 1854, he was registered by the board of lawyers of Nancy.

After several trips to the Americas, he devoted himself to writing, publishing Le Châtiment in 1855 before approaching the theater with the comedy À la Campagne in 1857. In 1859, in collaboration with Charles Edmond Villetard de Prunières, he wrote Le Testament de César Girodot, a show which was performed over 500 times at the Odéon theater.

Belot wrote the novel Mademoiselle Giraud, My Wife in 1870, centered around a naive young man and his eponymous wife who refuses to consummate their marriage. The book achieved was an immense success, selling at least 66,000 copies and has been published in 33 editions around the world.

Belot died of pulmonary congestion at the age of 61, on the 18th of December, 1890.

Belot fathered two daughters: Marthe and Jeanne, the latter of which became an actress at the Odéon theatre under the pseudonym of "Miss Belly". She died of typhoid fever in January 1899.

Theater Works 
1859 : Un Secret de Famille, 5 acts, Théâtre de l'Ambigu ;
1860 : La Vengeance du Mari, 3 acts, Théâtre de l'Odéon ;
1861 : Les Parents Terribles, 3 acts, en collaboration avec Léon Journault, Théâtre de l'Odéon ;
1862 : Les Maris à Système, 3 acts, Théâtre du Gymnase ;
1862 : Le Vrai Courage, 2 acts, Théâtre du Vaudeville ;
1863 : Les Indifférents, 4 acts, Théâtre de l'Odéon ;
1865 : Le Passé de M. Jouanne, 4 acts, a collaboration with Henri Crisafulli, Théâtre du Gymnase ;
1865 : L’Habitude et le Souvenir, 4 acts, Théâtre du Vaudeville ;
1867 : La Vénus de Gordes, with Ernest Daudet
1867 : Les Souvenirs, 4 acts, Théâtre du Vaudeville ;
1868 : Le Drame de la Rue de la Paix, 5 acts, Théâtre de l'Odéon ;
1868 : Miss Multon, 3 acts, with Eugène Nus, Théâtre du Vaudeville, 150 shows ;
1869 : La Leçon du Jour, 4 acts, with Eugène Nus, Théâtre du Vaudeville ;
1871 : L’Article 47, 5 acts, Théâtre de l’Ambigu, 100 shows ;
1873 : La Marquise, 4 acts, with Eugène Nus, Théatre du Gymnase ;
1876 : Fromont Jeune et Risler Aîné, 5 acts, (An adaptation of a novel by Alphonse Daudet), Théâtre du Vaudeville ;
1880 : Les Étrangleurs de Paris, a drama in 5 acts and 12 paintings, Théâtre de la Porte Saint-Martin ;
1885 : Sapho, 5 acts, (An adaptation of a novel by d'Alphonse Daudet), Théâtre du Gymnase ; Sappho, Eng. trans. by. Elizabeth Beall Ginty

Short Stories and Novels 
Un Cas de Conscience ;
La Venus de Gordes, a collaboration with Ernest Daudet, Dentu, Paris ;
Le Secret Terrible - a collaboration with Jules Dautin, Dentu, Paris ;
Le Parricide - a collaboration with Jules Dautin, Dentu, Paris ;
Dacolard et Lubin (A sequel to Le Parricide), a collaboration with Jules Dautin, Dentu, Paris ;
La Sultane Parisienne, Dentu, Paris ;
Nouvelles, 1857 ;
Trois nouvelles, 1863 ;
La Vénus de Gordes, a collaboration with Ernest Daudet, 1866 ; 10th edition, 1879
Le Drame de la Rue de la Paix, Michel Lévy frères, Paris, 1867 ;
L'Article 47 (La fille de couleur ; Le journal d'une jeune fille ; La haute police), Dentu, Paris, 1870 ;
Mademoiselle Giraud, ma femme, 1870 ;
La Femme de feu, 1872 ;
Hélène et Mathilde, 1874 ;

Awards and honors 
Legion of Honour - 1867 ;

References 
Footnotes

Bibliography
Ernest Glaeser, Biographie nationale des contemporains : rédigée par une Société de gens de lettres sous la direction de M. Ernest Glaeser, Paris, Glaeser et cie, 1878, p. 838.
Henri Adolphe Lara, Contribution de la Guadeloupe à la pensée française : 1635–1935, Paris, Jean Crès, 1936, p. 301.

External links

 

French male writers
19th-century French dramatists and playwrights
1829 births
1890 deaths